Cox Farmhouse is a historic home located at Rhinebeck, Dutchess County, New York. It was built in the mid- to late-18th century and expanded and remodeled in 1843. It is a -story, L-shaped, stone-and-brick dwelling in the Greek Revival style. It is five bays wide and two bays deep and is topped by a gable roof.  It features an elaborate, ornamented entrance.

It was added to the National Register of Historic Places in 1987.

See also

National Register of Historic Places listings in Rhinebeck, New York

References

Houses on the National Register of Historic Places in New York (state)
Greek Revival houses in New York (state)
Houses completed in 1842
Houses in Rhinebeck, New York
National Register of Historic Places in Dutchess County, New York